Sylescaptia ambarawae is a moth in the subfamily Arctiinae. It was described by van Eecke in 1920. It is found on Java.

References

Natural History Museum Lepidoptera generic names catalog

Moths described in 1920
Lithosiini